is a train station in Ōyodo, Yoshino District, Nara Prefecture, Japan.

Lines 
 Kintetsu Railway
 Yoshino Line

Platforms and tracks

Surrounding Area

External links
 

Railway stations in Japan opened in 1927
Railway stations in Nara Prefecture